Asura intermedia is a moth of the family Erebidae. It is found in Japan.

References

intermedia
Moths described in 1923
Moths of Japan